The following list of G20 summits summarizes all G20 conferences held at various different levels: summits of heads of state or heads of government, ministerial-level meetings, Engagement Group meetings and others.

Summits of state leaders

Ministerial-level meetings

Finance ministers and central bank governors 
Locations in bold text indicate the meeting was concurrent with a G20 summit. Ministerial meetings not always held in summit host country.

Labor and Employment Ministers

Foreign ministers

Trade ministers

B20 summits 
B20 summits are summits of business leaders from the G20 countries.

 2012:  Los Cabos
 2013:  Saint Petersburg
 2014:  Sydney
 2015:  Turkey
 2016:  Hangzhou
 2017:  Berlin
 2018:  Buenos Aires
 2019:  Tokyo
 2020:  Riyadh
 2021:  Rome
 2022:  Bali, Indonesia

L20 summits 
L20 summits are summits of trade union and labour leaders from the G20 countries.

 2008:  Washington
 2009:  London
 2009:  Pittsburgh
 2010:  Toronto
 2010:  Seoul
 2011:  Paris
 2012:  Los Cabos
 2013:  Moscow
 2014:  Brisbane
 2015:  Antalya
 2016:  Beijing
 2017:  Berlin
 2018:  Mendoza
 2019:  Tokyo
 2020:  Riyadh
 2021:  Rome
 2022:  Bali

C20 summits 
C20 summits are summits of civil society delegates from the G20 countries.

 2014:  Melbourne
 2015:  Istanbul
 2017:  Hamburg
 2018:  Buenos Aires
 2019:  Tokyo
 2020:  Riyadh
 2021:  Rome
 2022:  Bali

S20 summits 
S20 meetings and summits draw together academics and civil society delegates from the G20 countries.

 2017:
 2018:
 2019:
 2020:
 2021:
 2022:
 2023:

T20 summits 
T20 summits are summits of think tanks from the G20 countries.

 2012:  Mexico City
 2013:  Moscow
 2017:  Berlin
 2018:  Buenos Aires
 2019:  Tokyo
 2020:  Riyadh
 2021:  Milan
 2022:  Bali

U20 summits 
Urban 20 (U20) summits are summits of cities from the G20 countries.

 2018:  Buenos Aires
 2019:  Tokyo
 2020:  Riyadh
 2021:  Rome
 2022:  Jakarta

W20 summits 
First W20 women's summit organized by German Chancellor Angela Merkel.
 2017:  Berlin
 2018:  Buenos Aires
 2019:  Tokyo
 2020:  Riyadh
 2021:  Rome
 2022:  Lake Toba

Y20 summits 
Y20 summits are summits of young leaders and changemakers from 18 to 30 years old from the G20 countries.

2010:  Vancouver
2011:  Paris
2012:  Puebla
 2013:  Saint Petersburg
 2014:  Sydney
 2015:  Istanbul
 2016:  Beijing and Shanghai
 2017:  Berlin
 2018:  Córdoba
 2019:  Tokyo
 2020:  Riyadh
 2021:  Milan and Bergamo
 2022:  Jakarta and Bandung

See also 
 List of G7 summits

References

External links 

G20 website of the OECD
G20 Information Centre at the University of Toronto

G20
 
G-20
G-20